olwm (OPEN LOOK Window Manager) was the default stacking window manager for OpenWindows, the original X11 desktop environment included with SunOS and Solaris.  Its unique characteristic is its implementation of the OPEN LOOK look and feel.

Scott Oaks developed a variant of olwm, called olvwm (OPEN LOOK Virtual Window Manager), which implements a virtual root window with dimensions greater than those of the video display.

Key features 

Virtual Desktop Manager (olvwm only): allows windows to be dragged and dropped to any Workspace. The number of Workspaces is configurable; there are three rows of four Workspaces in the VDM in the lower illustration.
Workspace Menu: allows the user to start programs
Windows can be automatically started and positioned when the window manager starts (and can be started in a specific Workspace in olvwm), using the config file
olvwm includes its own config file, which allows the user to resize and reposition a window using a shortcut key
"Focus follows mouse" capability
 Ability to switch and click-into a workspace (using the olvwm VDM).
Customizable colors
Specify no, or minimal, window borders (olvwm only)
Sticky windows (olvwm only)

See also  
SunView

References

X window managers
Sun Microsystems software